Patrick Staudacher (born 29 April 1980) is a former Italian alpine skier.

Career
He won the super-G gold medal at the 2007 World Championships in Åre.

National titles
Staudacher has won six national titles.

Italian Alpine Ski Championships
Downhill: 2010 (1)
Super-G: 2001, 2005, 2010 (3)
Combined: 2001 (1)

References

External links
 
 Official fanclub site
 Band-site of Patrick Staudacher

1980 births
Italian male alpine skiers
Alpine skiers at the 2002 Winter Olympics
Alpine skiers at the 2006 Winter Olympics
Alpine skiers at the 2010 Winter Olympics
Olympic alpine skiers of Italy
Germanophone Italian people
Sportspeople from Sterzing
Living people
Alpine skiers of Centro Sportivo Carabinieri